Auvers-sur-Oise (literally Auvers on Oise) is a commune in the department of Val-d'Oise, on the northwestern outskirts of Paris, France. It is associated with several famous artists, the most prominent being Vincent van Gogh. This was the place where van Gogh died, apparently by suicide.

Geography

Location

Auvers is located on the right bank of the river Oise. To the south, it is connected to Méry-sur-Oise by a bridge.

Localities

 Chaponval
 Cordeville (from Corbeville)
 Le Montcel (from Monsellus, small mountain)
 Les Vaissenots or Vessenots
 Le Valhermeil (from Val Hermer, name of the owner during the 12th century)
 Les Vallées

History
During the 19th century, a number of painters lived and worked in Auvers-sur-Oise, including Paul Cézanne, Charles-François Daubigny, Camille Pissarro, Jean-Baptiste-Camille Corot, Norbert Goeneutte, and Vincent van Gogh. Daubigny's house is now a museum where one can see paintings by the artist, his family, and friends, such as Honoré Daumier, as well as rooms decorated in period style.
Charles Sprague Pearce (1851-1914) died there also.
Along the river walk from Auvers toward Pontoise are a number of views which featured in the paintings of Pissarro.

During the 20th century artists continued to frequent Auvers, including Henri Rousseau (Douanier Rousseau), Otto Freundlich and Pierre Daboval. The COBRA artist Corneille spent his last years in the village and is buried a few metres from Vincent van Gogh.

Population

Administration

On 1 August 1948, 17% of the territory of Auvers-sur-Oise was detached and became the commune of Butry-sur-Oise.

The current mayor is Isabelle Mézières. She was first elected in 2014, and was then re-elected in March 2020.

Culture

Monuments

The creation of the church dates back to the 11th century. Louis VI le Gros (1081-1137) owned a manor in Auvers, where he often used to come to hunt. In 1131 his son, Philippe, who was the crown prince, accidentally fell from his horse and died. A chapel was erected for his burial place and this subsequently became the church Notre-Dame de l'Assomption: in 1915 it was listed as a historic monument. Together with the royal manor, they represent a major historical piece of the heritage of the city, where many famous painters came during the 19th century, such as Daubigny, Bourges, Bernard, Pearce, Bastard, Boggio or Wickenden.

Museums

 The musée Daubigny, located in the Colombières manor, was created in 1986 by the Tourist Office. The museum owns about a hundred works by Daubigny, such as paintings, drawings and engravings. The artist arrived in Auvers in the 1860s and stayed there for 18 years. He had a workshop boat called the "Botin", where he used to paint fluvial landscapes and sailed with his son, Karl. Then, many of his friends also came to Auvers to paint the landscapes. The museum mainly deals with pre-Impressionism. It has been a municipal museum since 2012.
 The musée de l'absinthe (Absinthe museum), located on the street rue Callé, deals with the history of the drink.

Van Gogh

Dr. Paul Gachet lived in Auvers-sur-Oise. He was acquainted with the avant-garde artists of the time. Through this connection, Vincent van Gogh moved to Auvers to be treated by him, though he considered the doctor to be in a worse state than himself. Gachet befriended Van Gogh and was the subject of two portraits, one of which, Portrait of Dr. Gachet, was sold at auction  for over $80m (£48m) in 1990.

Van Gogh died from a self-inflicted gunshot wound to the chest. The room on the upper floor of the Auberge Ravoux where he died has been preserved, although no furniture remains. The Institut Van Gogh owns Auberge Ravoux, organizes the visits of Van Gogh's room and has opened a restaurant in the dining room. Auvers-sur-Oise is the final resting place of both Vincent and his brother Theo van Gogh, who died six months later.

Transport
Auvers-sur-Oise is served by two stations on the Transilien Paris – Nord suburban rail line: Chaponval and Auvers-sur-Oise. The stations both lie on the line Pontoise-Creil. Between April and October, on Saturdays, Sundays and public holidays, direct trains go from Paris Gare du Nord to Auvers.

Auvers is also served by two bus lines : 95 07 and 95 17.

See also
 Communes of the Val-d'Oise department
 Auvers during the time of Vincent van Gogh

References

External links

The Complete Works of Vincent van Gogh
Following Vincent Van Gogh in Auvers-sur-Oise
Association of Mayors of the Val d'Oise 
Musée d'Aubigny

Communes of Val-d'Oise